The St. Lawrence Laurentians is a soccer club founded in 1904 and based in St. Lawrence, Newfoundland.

St. Lawrence is dubbed "Soccer Capital of Canada" due to its great success over the years.  With a population of 1,350, the town has 9 organized soccer teams. The senior men's team hold the record for most all-time Newfoundland Challenge Cup wins with 29, including the competition's first season in 1967, and have represented their province numerous times at the Canadian National Challenge Cup (the winner of the Newfoundland Challenge Cup qualifies for the Canadian National Challenge Cup). The club also holds the record for most consecutive Newfoundland titles with 8 between 1995-2002.

The main pitch, St. Lawrence Centennial Soccer Field, is a municipal heritage site. On that basis, it was added to the national Register of Historic Places in 2005.

Labatt's is the club sponsor so the team is also known as St. Lawrence Labatt Laurentians

Honours
 Newfoundland and Labrador Challenge Cup Champions (25) : 1967-68, 1971–72, 1975–78, 1980, 1982, 1993, 1995-2002, 2005-08, 2013, 2016
 Canadian National Challenge Cup silver medalists : 1975, 1977, 2002
 Canadian National Challenge Cup bronze medalists : 1999, 2007

Sources

 CBC's Soccer Day in Canada

Association football clubs established in 1904
Soccer clubs in Newfoundland and Labrador